Sir Robert George Caldwell Kinahan, ERD (24 September 1916 – 2 May 1997) was a politician, businessman and a senior member of the Orange Order in Northern Ireland. In his obituary, he was described as one of the last of the "county elite" to remain a high-ranking member of the Orange Order during the turbulent years of The Troubles, when it became potentially dangerous to belong. In his personal life he deplored bigotry and was almost expelled from the Orange Order for having attended a Roman Catholic funeral service.

Background
Born in Belfast to Henry Kinahan and Blanche Grierson Kinahan, daughter of the Bishop of Connor and Bishop of Down and Dromore, Robin Kinahan was educated at Stowe. Upon leaving school he went straight into the family firm with a Vintners' Company scholarship, which took him to Oporto and Bordeaux, this facilitated his knowledge of wine and the French language.

War years
During World War II he joined the Royal Artillery, the 8th (Belfast) Heavy Anti-Aircraft Regiment, serving briefly in France before the Dunkirk withdrawal, then in the air defence of Coventry and London before ending up in Burma under General Slim.

Political career
Following the war he entered politics as councillor for Belfast Oldpark, where in 1948 he defeated Labour activist Billy Blease. In 1956 he was appointed High Sheriff of Belfast. He served in the Belfast Corporation for 10 years before becoming a Stormont Member of Parliament for Belfast Clifton, defeating the incumbent independent Unionist Norman Porter.

He was an MP for only a few months as he could not resist the opportunity to be lord mayor of Belfast. In 1961 he earned the knighthood which accompanied the lord mayorship at that time. He was Lord Mayor from 1959 to 1961, the youngest person to have done so at that time. In 1969, he was appointed High Sheriff of Antrim.

Orange Order
In the family firm, Lyle and Kinahan wine and spirit merchants, which was founded by his paternal grandfather, there was a large contingent of Catholic workers and Kinahan would often relate how, before The Troubles, they turned out to cheer him on 12 July as he walked with his lodge to the "field". He was almost expelled from the Orange Order for having attended a Roman Catholic funeral service.

Personal life
He and his wife, Coralie de Burgh, an artist (and daughter of Captain Charles de Burgh, The Lodge, Seaforde, County Down), set about restoring it from an almost ruinous state. He and his wife had two sons and three daughters. His son, Danny Kinahan, was appointed to the Northern Ireland Assembly in 2009 and was a successful Ulster Unionist Party candidate in the 2011 Northern Ireland Assembly election having been elected to Antrim Borough Council in 2005. At the 2015 general election, Danny was elected MP for South Antrim.

Later life
Unlike many Unionists he agreed, reluctantly, to serve on the short-lived Northern Ireland Advisory Commission, set up with seven Protestant and four Catholic members by William Whitelaw, Secretary of State for Northern Ireland, after the suspension of Stormont in 1972 and the imposition of direct rule. He served as chairman of the Ulster Bank (1970–1982) – he made a point of visiting every branch of the bank, vice Lord Lieutenant of Belfast (1976–1985), Lord Lieutenant of Belfast (1985–1991). He died at the age of 80.

Publications
Behind Every Great Man …? (published in 1992)

References

1916 births
1997 deaths
High Sheriffs of Belfast
High Sheriffs of Antrim
Royal Artillery officers
British Army personnel of World War II
Lord-Lieutenants of Belfast
Lord Mayors of Belfast
Members of the House of Commons of Northern Ireland 1958–1962
Members of the Senate of Northern Ireland 1957–1961
People educated at Stowe School
Ulster Unionist Party members of the House of Commons of Northern Ireland
Members of the House of Commons of Northern Ireland for Belfast constituencies
Ulster Unionist Party members of the Senate of Northern Ireland
Ulster Unionist Party councillors
Knights Bachelor